Sourindra Mohan Sircar (1908-1978) was a botanist specializing in plant physiology and anatomy.

Career
He joined the Calcutta University in 1937 as a lecturer in botany and later became the head of the department. He was appointed director of the Bose Institute, Kolkata. He later worked at the Imperial College of Science and Technology, London. He founded the school of Plant Physiology, which has made significant contributions to plant science research and teaching in India.

General Presidents of ISCA
He was appointed the General President of Indian Science Congress Association from 1977 to 78, which is a professional body under the Ministry of Science and Technology.

Work
He was one of the pioneers of plant physiological research in India. His work was centered around the indica cultivars f rice plants. The discoveries of germination and growth inhibitors, as also isolation of new gibberellins were remarkable contributions. His contributions on nutrition, lodging and the relationship between translocation, photosynthesis and yield of rice paved the way for understanding the lower yield potential of rice varieties. Double cropping of rice was his important contribution, which has found practical applications. The integration of physiological phenomena characterized his research activities.

References

External links
Indian Science Congress Association (ISCA)

20th-century Indian botanists
1978 deaths
1908 births
Scientists from West Bengal
Academic staff of the University of Calcutta